Shaneel Naidu (born 28 March 1995) is a Fijian footballer. He represented Fiji in the football competition at the 2016 Summer Olympics.

References

External links

1995 births
Living people
Fijian footballers
Fiji international footballers
2016 OFC Nations Cup players
Footballers at the 2016 Summer Olympics
Olympic footballers of Fiji
Association football goalkeepers
Fijian people of Indian descent